Aleksei Sergeyevich Medvedev (born 5 January 1977) is a Russian professional football coach and a former player.

Career 
Medvedev, an alumnus of CSKA Moscow youth school, started his professional career in 1995 playing for Orekhovo in the Russian Second Division. In 1998, he became the league top scorer with 24 goals.

Following this achievement, Medvedev signed for the Russian Premier League club FC Saturn Ramenskoye in 1999. In 2000, he moved to Dynamo Moscow for a reported fee of €200,000. He played in the UEFA Cup 2000–01 and UEFA Cup 2001–02 for FC Dynamo Moscow (5 games). In 2002, Saturn brought his back to Ramenskoye for a reported sum of €325,000.

In 2005, he was loaned to Tom Tomsk, and in 2006 he signed for Krylia Sovetov Samara.

Two years later, Medvedev moved to the Russian First Division club Sibir Novosibirsk. With Sibir Medvedev, as the team's captain, became the First Division top scorer, best striker and best player in 2009, and helped the club to be promoted to the Russian Premier League for the first time in its history. On 20 March 2010, he scored Sibir's first goal in the Premier League. On 21 April 2010, Medvedev's hat-trick led the team to the 2009–10 Russian Cup final, and to the European stage. On 29 July 2010, he scored the first Sibir's goal at the international level when Sibir defeated Apollon Limassol (1:0) in the UEFA Europa League qualification.

In August 2010, he moved to Rubin Kazan for a reported fee of €1 million.

Honours
 Russian First Division best player: 2009.
 Russian First Division best striker: 2009.
 Russian First Division top scorer: 2009 (18 goals).

References

1977 births
Living people
People from Pavlovo-Posadsky District
Russian footballers
FC Saturn Ramenskoye players
FC Dynamo Moscow players
FC Tom Tomsk players
PFC Krylia Sovetov Samara players
FC Sibir Novosibirsk players
FC Rubin Kazan players
PFC Spartak Nalchik players
FC Khimki players
Russian Premier League players
Russian football managers
Association football forwards
FC Znamya Truda Orekhovo-Zuyevo players
Sportspeople from Moscow Oblast